Iron is the debut studio album by Moravian (Czech) folk metal band Silent Stream of Godless Elegy, released in December 1996 by Leviathan Records. The songs on the album are sung in English.

Track listing
 "Ugly Jewel" – 4:45
 "Passion & Desire" – 3:11
 "Iron Mask" – 4:15
 "Last" – 4:52
 "Desolated Remain" – 4:09
 "Only Stream" – 1:42
 "Crying Heaven" – 4:01
 "Burned by Love to Christ" – 2:12
 "Bittery Sweet" – 4:00
 "Naked Susan" – 2:36
 "Amber Sea" – 3:58
 "Apotheosis" – 5:01

References

Silent Stream of Godless Elegy albums
1996 albums